Pandit Kishan Maharaj (3 September 1923 – 4 May 2008) was an Indian tabla player who belonged to the Benares gharana of Hindustani classical music.

Early life and background
Kishan Maharaj ji was born in Kabir Chaura, Benaras into a family of professional musicians. He was initially trained in classical music by his father, Hari Maharaj. After his father's death, his training was taken over by his uncle, Kanthe Maharaj.

Musical career
By the time he was eleven, Kishan Maharaj began performing in concerts. Within a few years, Kishan Maharaj was sharing the stage with stalwarts like Faiyaz Khan, Omkarnath Thakur, Bade Ghulam Ali Khan, Bhimsen Joshi, Ravi Shankar, Ali Akbar Khan, Vasant Rai, Vilayat Khan, Girija Devi, Sitara Devi and many others.
 
Maharaj had the ability to play cross-rhythms and produce complex calculations, particularly in tihai patterns. Known as an excellent accompanist, Maharaj was extremely versatile and capable of playing with any accompaniment, be it with the Sitar, Sarod, Dhrupad, Dhamar or even dance.

Maharaj gave a number of solo concerts during his career and also gave `Sangat` to some great dancers like Sri Shambhu Maharaj, Sitara Devi, Natraj Gopi Krishna, and Birju Maharaj.

Among all his compositions, his "Tala Vadya Kacheri" with the Mridangam Vidwan, "Palghat Raghu" stood out. Maharaj extensively toured and participated in several prestigious events across the world, including the Edinburgh festival and the Commonwealth Arts festival in the United Kingdom in 1965.

Maharaj was awarded the Padma Shri in 1973 and the Padma Vibhushan in 2002. He was married to Beena devi niece of Tabla maestro of Benaras Pt. Anokhe lal mishra

Death and legacy
Pt. Kishan Maharaj died on 4 May 2008 at Khajuri near Varanasi, aged 84.

References

External links

1923 births
2008 deaths
Recipients of the Padma Shri in arts
Recipients of the Padma Vibhushan in arts
Hindustani instrumentalists
Tabla players
Recipients of the Sangeet Natak Akademi Award
Musicians from Varanasi
20th-century Indian musicians
20th-century drummers
Recipients of the Sangeet Natak Akademi Fellowship